George Clayden (14 August 1903 – 25 March 1990) was an Australian rules footballer who played with Collingwood in the Victorian Football League (VFL).

Clayden usually played either across the centre half back or in the ruck and was known as one of the toughest players during his era. Nicknamed "Kitty", Clayden was a member of the Collingwood side which won four premierships in a row and also represented the VFL in interstate football. He retired in 1933 after sustaining a serious knee injury.

References

External links

1903 births
Collingwood Football Club players
Collingwood Football Club Premiership players
Australian rules footballers from Melbourne
1990 deaths
Four-time VFL/AFL Premiership players
People from Northcote, Victoria